The Pedraza Municipality is one of the 12 municipalities (municipios) that makes up the Venezuelan state of Barinas and, according to the 2011 census by the National Institute of Statistics of Venezuela, the municipality has a population of 65,390. The town of Ciudad Bolivia is the shire town of the Pedraza Municipality.

Demographics
The Pedraza Municipality, according to a 2007 population estimate by the National Institute of Statistics of Venezuela, has a population of 62,847 (up from 52,411 in 2000). This amounts to 8.3% of the state's population.

Government
The mayor of the Pedraza Municipality is Frenchy Tomas Díaz Rodríguez, re-elected on October 31, 2004, with 69% of the vote.  The municipality is divided into four parishes; Ciudad Bolivia, Ignacio Briceño, José Félix Ribas, Páez.

See also
Barinas
Municipalities of Venezuela

References

External links
pedraza-barinas.gob.ve 

Municipalities of Barinas (state)